Tianding Subdistrict is a subdistrict of Yuelu District in Changsha, Hunan, China. It was reorganized to a subdistrict from the former Tianding Township in August 2012.

History
In 1962, Tianding Commune was organized from Wangyue Commune and it was placed under the jurisdiction of Bairuo District in Changsha County. In January 1978, the commune of Tianding was under jurisdiction of Bairuo District  in Wangcheng County with the restoration of Wangcheng County from Changsha County. In March 1984, the township of Tianding was re-established in place of Tianding Commune, the township had 14 villages under the jurisdiction with a total area of 41.7 square kilometers. Tianding Township was transferred to Yuelu District from Wangcheng County with the adjustment of districts of Changsha in July 1996.

In January 1998, the two villages of Wangxin and Jiantang were assigned to Wangchengpo Subdistrict with its establishment. The division of Tianding Township was reduced from the original 14 villages to 12 villages.

In May 2004, five villages in the southern part were changed to Wangchengpo Economic Development Zone (Meixihu Management Committee) under its trusteeship. In 2007, the subdistrict of Meixihu was approved to establish from five villages of Lianluo, Xuehu, Zhongtang, Tianding and Qitian, and Yangming Shanzhuang Community of Tianding Township.

In August 2012, the township of Tianding was reorganized as a subdistrict, the subdistrict of Tianding covers an area of 20.86 square kilometers with a population of 58,600, it was divided seven villages and a community in the year, of which were Hangtian Community, seven villages of Jianshan, Yong'an, Yanzishan, Qingshui, Yanlian, Chuantang and Qingshan.

In 2016, the 2 villages of Jianshan and Qingshan were merged to establish Jianqing Xincun Village, the 2 villages of Yong'an and Yanzishan as Yongyan Xincun Village, the 2 villages of Yanlian and Qingshui as Yanqing Xincun Village, and the village of Chuantang  was reorganized as the community of Chuantang.

Subdivisions
By 2017, the subdistrict of Tianding has a village and eight communities under its jurisdiction.

8 villages
 Chuantang Community
 Hangtian Community
 Jianshan Community
 Qingshan Xincun Community
 Qingshui Community
 Xinghu Community
 Yanlian Community
 Yongheng Community

a community
 Yongyan Xincun Village

References

External links
 Official Website （Chinese / 中文）

Yuelu District
Subdistricts of Changsha